Johann Baptist von Keller (16 May 1774 – 17 October 1845) was a German Catholic priest from Salem. He served as the first Bishop of Rottenburg.

Keller was consecrated a priest in 1797 and was called to Württemberg in 1808. In 1816, he was made Auxiliary Bishop of Augsburg and Titular Bishop of Evaria by Pope Pius VII. This consecration was done by the Pope himself.

Keller became the Vicar General of Rottenburg in 1819. The Diocese of Rottenburg was created in 1821, and Keller was made its first bishop in 1828. He died in 1845 in Schrozberg.

1774 births
1845 deaths
Roman Catholic bishops of Rottenburg
Members of the Württembergian Chamber of Lords
Members of the Württembergian Chamber of Deputies
People from Bodenseekreis